IBM and the Holocaust: The Strategic Alliance between Nazi Germany and America's Most Powerful Corporation is a book by investigative journalist and historian Edwin Black which documents the strategic technology services rendered by US-based multinational corporation International Business Machines (IBM) and its German and other European subsidiaries for the Nazi government of Adolf Hitler from the beginning of the Third Reich in January 1933 through the last day of the regime in May 1945 at the end of  World War II. Published in 2001, with numerous subsequent expanded editions, Black outlined the key role of IBM's technology in the Nazi genocide, by facilitating the regime's generation and tabulation of punch cards for national census data, military logistics, ghetto statistics, train traffic management, and concentration camp capacity.

Summary 
In the early 1880s, Herman Hollerith (1860–1929), a young employee at the U.S. Census Bureau, conceived of the idea of creating readable cards with standardized perforations, each representing specific individual traits such as gender, nationality, and occupation. The millions of punched cards created for the population counted in the national census could then be sorted on the basis of specific bits of information they contained—thereby providing a quantified portrait of the nation and its citizens. A circuit-closing device was used to electromagnetically record the data represented by the perforations. The technology enabled searching for individuals using the traits as search terms.

In 1910, the German licensee Willy Heidinger established the Deutsche Hollerith Maschinen Gesellschaft (German Hollerith Machine Corporation), known by the abbreviation "Dehomag". The counting machine operation was made part of a new conglomerate called the Computing-Tabulating-Recording Company (CTR). Flint chose Thomas J. Watson (1874–1956), the star salesman of the National Cash Register Corporation, to head the new operation. In 1923, the German licensee Dehomag became a direct subsidiary of the American corporation CTR. In 1924, Watson assumed the role of Chief Executive Officer of CTR and renamed the company International Business Machines (IBM).

Black details an ongoing business relationship between Watson's IBM and the emerging German regime headed by Adolf Hitler and his National Socialist German Workers Party (NSDAP). Hitler came to power in January 1933; on March 20 of that same year he established a concentration camp for political prisoners in the Bavarian town of Dachau, just outside the city of Munich. Repression against political opponents and the country's ethnic Jewish population began immediately. By April 1933, some 60,000 had been imprisoned. Business relations between IBM and the Hitler regime continued uninterrupted in the face of broad international calls for an economic boycott. Willy Heidinger, who remained the chief executive of Dehomag, the German subsidiary of which IBM owned 90%, was an enthusiastic supporter of the Hitler regime.

On April 12, 1933, the German government announced plans to conduct a long-delayed national census. The project was particularly important to the Nazis as a mechanism for the identification of Jews, Roma, and other ethnic groups deemed undesirable by the regime. Dehomag offered to assist the German government in its task of ethnic identification, focusing upon the 41 million residents of Prussia. This activity was not only countenanced by Thomas Watson and IBM in America, Black argues, but was actively encouraged and financially supported, with Watson himself traveling to Germany in October 1933 and the company ramping up its investment in its German subsidiary from 400,000 to 7,000,000 Reichsmark—about $1 million (equivalent to $ in ). This injection of American capital allowed Dehomag to purchase land in Berlin and to construct IBM's first factory in Germany, Black charges, thereby "tooling up for what it correctly saw as a massive financial relationship with the Hitler regime".

Black also cites documents regarding a "secret deal" that was made between Heidinger and Watson during the latter's visit to Germany which allowed Dehomag commercial powers outside of Germany, enabling the "now Nazified" company to "circumvent and supplant" various national subsidiaries and licensees by "soliciting and delivering punch card solution technology directly to IBM customers in those territories". As a result, Nazi Germany soon became the second most important customer of IBM after the lucrative U.S. market. The 1933 census, with design help and tabulation services provided by IBM through its German subsidiary, proved to be pivotal to the Nazis in their efforts to identify, isolate, and ultimately destroy the country's Jewish minority. Machine-tabulated census data greatly expanded the estimated number of Jews in Germany by identifying individuals with only one or a few Jewish ancestors. Previous estimates of 400,000 to 600,000 were abandoned for a new estimate of 2 million Jews in the nation of 65 million.

As the Nazi war machine occupied successive nations of Europe, capitulation was followed by a census of the population of each subjugated nation, with an eye to the identification and isolation of Jews and Romani. These census operations were intimately intertwined with technology and cards supplied by IBM's German and new Polish subsidiaries, which were awarded specific sales territories in Poland by decision of the New York office following Germany's successful Blitzkrieg invasion. Data generated by means of counting and alphabetization equipment supplied by IBM through its German and other national subsidiaries was instrumental in the efforts of the German government to concentrate and ultimately destroy ethnic Jewish populations across Europe. Black reports that every Nazi concentration camp maintained its own Hollerith-Abteilung (Hollerith Department), assigned with keeping tabs on inmates through use of IBM's punchcard technology. In his book, Black charges that "without IBM's machinery, continuing upkeep and service, as well as the supply of punch cards, whether located on-site or off-site, Hitler's camps could have never managed the numbers they did."

Major changes were made for the 2002 paperback editions on Three Rivers Press/Time Warner Paperbacks and the 2012 expanded edition on Dialog Press. In the updated 2002 paperback edition, the author included new evidence of the connection between IBM's United States headquarters and its Polish subsidiary during Nazi occupation. In 2012 Black published a second expanded revision with more documents. The 2012 expanded edition provides 32 pages of new photographic and documentary evidence.

IBM's post-invasion Polish subsidiary 
A revised 2002 paperback edition provides additional evidence that IBM New York established a special subsidiary in Poland called Watson Business Machines to deal with railway traffic in the General Government. Edwin Black asserts that IBM did so after the September 1, 1939 Nazi Invasion of Poland, and continued this business relationship during the Holocaust in Poland. Watson Business Machines operated a punch card printing shop near the Warsaw Ghetto.

In a 2002 editorial in the SFGate, Black documented that this Polish subsidiary reported to IBM Geneva which in turn reported to IBM New York.  Black further states that IBM's European general manager reported directly to Thomas Watson Sr., that some machines in Poland were sent to Romania to assist in the Jewish census there, and that these Polish machines were later replaced.

In his book, Black quotes Leon Krzemieniecki, the last surviving person involved in the administration of the rail transportation to Auschwitz and Treblinka, as stating he knew the punched card machines were not German machines, because the labels were in English. Black details how income from the machines leased in Poland was sent through Geneva to IBM in New York.

Ongoing sales 
Edwin Black details how IBM not only leased Nazi Germany the machines, but then provided continuous maintenance service, and sold the spare parts and the special paper needed for the customized punch cards.

After the publication of the 2012 expanded edition, he wrote for the Huffington Post, "The punch cards, machinery, training, servicing, and special project work, such as population census and identification, was managed directly by IBM headquarters in New York, and later through its subsidiaries in Germany, known as Deutsche Hollerith-Maschinen Gesellschaft (DEHOMAG), Poland, Holland, France, Switzerland, and other European countries." He added that the punch cards bore the indicia of the German subsidiary Dehomag.

Reception

IBM's response 
Though IBM has never directly denied any of the evidence posed by the book, it has criticized Black's research methods and accusatory conclusions. IBM claimed it does not have any other information about the company during its World War II period or the operations of Dehomag, as it argued most documents were destroyed or lost during the war.

IBM also claimed that an earlier dismissed lawsuit, initiated by lawyers representing concentration camp survivors, was filed in 2001 to coincide with Black's book launch. Lawyers for the Holocaust victims acknowledged the timing of the lawsuit to coincide with Black's book release, explaining their public relations strategies played an important role in their record of achieving Nazi-era settlements totaling more than $7 billion without winning a judgment.

After the publication of Black's updated 2002 paperback edition, IBM responded by stating it wasn't convinced there were any new findings and there was no proof IBM had enabled the Holocaust. IBM rejected Black's assertion that IBM was hiding information and records regarding its World War II era. Several years previously, IBM had given its corporate records of the period to academic archives in New York and Stuttgart, Germany, for review by undefined "independent scholars".

In early 2021, Black published the 20th anniversary edition with special public events and a syndicated article stating that in twenty years, "not a comma has been changed", adding that "IBM has never requested a correction or denied any facts in the book."

Wikipedia editing controversy 
In 2010, Black reported on unidentified Wikipedia editors marginalizing his research on IBM's role in the Holocaust. It is not clear whether the editors involved were IBM employees, but Black states that, "[they were] openly fortified by official IBM corporate archivist Paul Lasewicz using his real name, and others"; Black nevertheless calls Lasewicz a "man of integrity" and points out that he deferred taking the lead because of potential conflict of interest and then recused himself entirely.

Critical response 
The book was published on February 11, 2001, simultaneously in 40 countries in 14 languages, with numerous subsequent expanded editions, and hundreds of published reviews in many languages have appeared.

At the first edition release in 2001, Newsweek called the book "explosive", adding, "backed by exhaustive research, Black's case is simple and stunning. ... Black clearly demonstrates that Nazi Germany employed IBM Hollerith punch-card machines to perform critical tasks in carrying out the Holocaust and the German war effort ... Black establishes beyond dispute that IBM Hollerith machines significantly advanced Nazi efforts to exterminate Jewry." 

In 2003, the American Society of Journalists and Authors acknowledged IBM and the Holocaust with its award for Best Non-Fiction Book of the Year.

Richard Bernstein, writing for The New York Times Book Review about the original 2001 first edition, said "Edwin Black makes a copiously documented case for the utter amorality of the profit motive and its indifference to consequences" but that Black's case "is long and heavily documented, and yet he does not demonstrate that IBM bears some unique or decisive responsibility for the evil that was done".

In a 2001 review in the Los Angeles Times, historian and UCLA professor Saul Friedlander wrote, "The author convincingly shows the relentless efforts made by IBM to maximize profit by selling its machines and its punch cards to a country whose criminal record would soon be widely recognized. Indeed, Black demonstrates with great precision that the godlike owner of the corporation, Thomas Watson, was impervious to the moral dimension of his dealings with Hitler's Germany and for years even had a soft spot for the Nazi regime."

In another review of the first edition, David Cesarani of Southampton University stated that Black provided "shocking evidence" that IBM in America continued to provide punch cards and other services to the Nazis "in defiance of Allied regulations against trading with the enemy."

In a 2001 review of the first edition in The Atlantic, Jack Beatty wrote, "This is a shocking book ... Edwin Black has documented a sordid relationship between this great American company and the Third Reich, one that extended into the war years."

Prof. Robert Urekew's review in the Harvard International Review stated: "Black's meticulous documentation reveals an undeniable fact: after the outbreak of the World War II, the IBM corporation knew the whereabouts of each of its European-leased machines, and what revenues it could expect from them."

After the updated paperback edition in 2002, Oliver Burkeman wrote for The Guardian, "The paperback provides the first evidence that the company's dealings with the Nazis were controlled from its New York headquarters throughout the second world war."  Sam Jaffe in Businessweek wrote: "With exhaustive research, Black makes the case that IBM and Watson conspired with Nazi Germany to help automate the genocide of Europe's Jews."

Reuters reported in 2002 that historians on Black's research team stated the paperback edition had used newly discovered Nazi documents and Polish eyewitness testimony to link IBM's U.S. operations directly to the Third Reich operations in Poland.

Several reviewers publicly retracted their negative reviews, with signed written apologies and donations to Holocaust museums, including reviewers in The Jerusalem Report, Nature Magazine, AudioFile magazine, Annals of the History of Computing, and the World Association of International Scholars.

Related legal actions 
In February 2001, an Alien Tort Claims Act claim was filed in U.S. federal court against IBM for allegedly providing the punched card technology that facilitated the Holocaust, and for covering up German IBM subsidiary Dehomag's activities. There was no evidence in the suit that IBM officials in New York explicitly ordered that technology be supplied to the Nazis with the understanding it would be used in concentration camps; however, lawyers representing victims of Nazi oppression claimed Dehomag's founder Heidinger expressed pride in giving Hitler data that could be used in "corrective interventions", and pledged to "follow his orders blindly". In April 2001, the lawsuit was dropped after lawyers feared the suit would slow down payments from a German Holocaust fund for Holocaust survivors who had suffered under Nazi persecution. IBM's German division had paid $3 million into the fund, while clearly avoiding admission of liability.

In 2004, the Roma human rights organization Gypsy International Recognition and Compensation Action (GIRCA) filed suit against IBM in Switzerland. However, the case was dismissed in 2006 under the relevant statute of limitations.

The Electronic Frontier Foundation (EFF) said in a 2015 unrelated lawsuit filed in U.S. federal court against IBM, "We point out the disturbing parallels between IBM's actions vis-à-vis South Africa and Nazi Germany: IBM New York purposefully 'facilitated gross human rights abuses by the Third Reich.'"

See also 
 Alfred P. Sloan
 Final Solution
 Henry Ford
 James D. Mooney
 Identification in Nazi camps
 List of international subsidiaries of IBM

References

External links 
 
 Excerpt from "IBM and the Holocaust" with photo of Hollerith machine, Jewish Virtual Library. Retrieved July 16, 2010.

2001 non-fiction books
History books about the Holocaust
Holocaust
Companies involved in the Holocaust
Books about companies